Sherkat-e Madaras is a village in Kenarshahr Rural District, in the Central District of Bardaskan County, Razavi Khorasan Province, Iran. At the 2006 census, its population was 20, in 8 families.

References 

Populated places in Bardaskan County